This is a sub-list from List of doping cases in sport representing a full list of surnames starting with R.

References

R